The 2021–22 Scottish Youth Cup was the 38th season of the Scottish Youth Cup, the national knockout tournament at youth level organised by the Scottish Football Association for its full and associate member clubs. The tournament was for the under-20 age group, to complement current youth development strategies, having formerly been an under-19 competition. Players born after 1 January 2002 were eligible to play.

It was the first tournament to feature a cup final since 2019, as the 2020 final and the whole of the 2020–21 competition were cancelled due to the COVID-19 pandemic.

Calendar

First round
Eight ties were played in this round.

Second round
Fourteen ties were played in this round. Ross County and Elgin City received byes to the third round.

Third round
Eight ties were played in this round.

Fourth round

Semi-finals
The semi-final ties were played on 24 February and 4 March 2022.

Final

External links
Youth Cup on Scottish FA website

References

5
Scottish Youth Cup seasons